The 20959 / 20960 Valsad–Vadnagar Intercity Superfast Express is a Superfast train of the Indian Railways connecting  and  of Gujarat. It is currently being operated with 20959/20960 train numbers on a daily basis. 

Valsad–Vadnagar Intercity Superfast Express was inaugurated by Minister of State for Railways and Textiles, Darshana Jardosh from 3 November 2022 at Surat railway station.

Service

20959/Valsad–Vadnagar Intercity Superfast Express has an average speed of 60 km/hr and covers 424 km in 7 hrs.
20960/Vadnagar–Valsad Intercity Superfast Express has an average speed of 56 km/hr and covers 424 km in 7 hrs 35 mins.

Route & halts

The important halts of the train are:

Gallery

References 

Transport in Valsad
Rail transport in Gujarat
Intercity Express (Indian Railways) trains
Railway services introduced in 2022